Mehmet Türkmehmet  (born 18 October 1980 in Kirkuk, Iraq) is an Iraqi Turkmen professional football midfielder.

He currently plays for Karşıyaka S.K. in the TFF First League.

External links
 Profile at TFF.org

Iraqi Turkmen people
1980 births
Living people
Turkish footballers
Iraqi footballers
Iraqi expatriate footballers
Diyarbakırspor footballers
Kartalspor footballers
Elazığspor footballers
Eskişehirspor footballers
Denizlispor footballers
MKE Ankaragücü footballers
Karşıyaka S.K. footballers
People from Kirkuk

Association football midfielders